Raimondas Žutautas (born 4 September 1972) is a former Lithuanian footballer and current head coach. Zutautas played as a defensive midfielder.

In 1999 Zutautas signed in Israeli club Maccabi Haifa F.C. and played there in the years 1999–2003. He won two championships with Maccabi Haifa and qualified to the UEFA Champions League group stage. Zutautas is considered one of the finest defensive midfielders played in the Israeli Premier League.

He is the only Lithuanian player to score two goals in the UEFA Champions League. In 2002, while playing for Maccabi Haifa, he scored against Manchester United. His second goal was scored a year later against Rangers while playing for Panathinaikos.

Managerial career
On 9 February 2010, Žutautas was appointed as the new manager of Lithuania. He is also Lithuania's youngest ever national coach at the age of 37.

Honours
A Lyga: champion (2)
1993–94, 1995–96
Israeli Premier League: champion (2)
2000–01, 2001–02
Greek Championship: champion (1)
2003–04
Greek Cup: winner (1)
2003–04

References

External links

1972 births
Living people
Lithuanian footballers
Lithuania international footballers
Lithuanian expatriate footballers
FK Inkaras Kaunas players
FC Spartak Vladikavkaz players
Maccabi Haifa F.C. players
Panathinaikos F.C. players
A Lyga players
Russian Premier League players
Israeli Premier League players
Super League Greece players
Expatriate footballers in Russia
Expatriate footballers in Israel
Expatriate footballers in Greece
Lithuanian expatriate sportspeople in Russia
Lithuanian expatriate sportspeople in Israel
Lithuanian expatriate sportspeople in Greece
Sportspeople from Klaipėda
Association football midfielders
Lithuanian football managers
Lithuania national football team managers
Lithuanian expatriate football managers